Ponometia cuta is a bird dropping moth in the family Noctuidae. The species was first described by Smith in 1905.

The MONA or Hodges number for Ponometia cuta is 9094.

References

Further reading

External links
 

Acontiinae
Articles created by Qbugbot
Moths described in 1905